Ghuskani is a village in the Bhiwani district of the Indian state of Haryana. , the village had 562 households with a population of 3,070 of which 1,653 were male and 1,417 female.

References

Villages in Bhiwani district